Thomas Bouhail (born 3 July 1986 in Montfermeil, Seine-Saint-Denis) is a French gymnast of Algerian descent. He won a silver medal in vault at the 2008 Summer Olympics.

In December 2011, just a few months before the 2012 Summer Olympics, Bouhail suffered a fractured tibia and fibula following a fall during a training session. Later it was revealed that the injury was more serious than it was first thought as it also affected his knee ligaments and the sciatic nerve, which led to complications and Bouhail had to undergo 15 operations in six weeks to have his leg saved. The surgical intervention was successful, however, it is unsure whether he can ever return to competitive gymnastics. Bouhail has personally announced the end of his gymnastics career and is now a gymnastics trainer.

References

External links
 

1986 births
Living people
People from Montfermeil
French male artistic gymnasts
Olympic gymnasts of France
Gymnasts at the 2008 Summer Olympics
Olympic silver medalists for France
French sportspeople of Algerian descent
Medalists at the World Artistic Gymnastics Championships
Olympic medalists in gymnastics
Medalists at the 2008 Summer Olympics
Mediterranean Games gold medalists for France
Mediterranean Games silver medalists for France
Mediterranean Games bronze medalists for France
Competitors at the 2005 Mediterranean Games
Competitors at the 2009 Mediterranean Games
Sportspeople from Seine-Saint-Denis
Mediterranean Games medalists in gymnastics
European champions in gymnastics